Ahmed Ali Jaber (born 2 August 1982 in Baghdad, Iraq) is a former Iraqi football goalkeeper. He was part of the Iraq national football team. He played in all four of Iraq’s matches in the 2004 AFC Asian Cup. However, he finished the campaign on a low, having been sent off in the quarter-finals against China after lashing out at China’s Sun Jihai. After losing his place to Noor Sabri in the 2004 Olympic Games, the Al Zawra’a goalkeeper returned to the national team in the Gulf Cup in the same year. He had a brief spell with Sanat Naft in Iran before returning to Al Zawra’a. On 16 September, he was released along with seven other players by Arbil FC.

He was one of the stars at the 2000 Asian Youth Championship in Tehran and clinched Iraq's place in the final of the Asian Youth Championship against Japan, beating Iran 7-6 on penalties after extra-time. Ahmed hammered home his spot-kick after saving the effort of Iranian striker Mansour Jamalyan and 2 other Iranian players, Ahmed then raced the length of the field to celebrate with the Iraqi fans before collapsing in a heap, overcome by the emotion.

However, he missed the final due to a yellow card he picked up after time wasting in the 90th minute. After his heroics in Iran, he was voted Iraqi goalkeeper of the year of 2000.

Honours

Country
 2007 Asian Cup winners

References

External links
 
 Iraq squad on AFC Asian Cup website

1982 births
Living people
Sportspeople from Baghdad
Iraqi footballers
Iraq international footballers
Expatriate footballers in Iran
Iraqi expatriate footballers
Al-Zawraa SC players
erbil SC players
2004 AFC Asian Cup players
2007 AFC Asian Cup players
AFC Asian Cup-winning players
Association football goalkeepers